Aplocheilus parvus, the dwarf panchax, is a species of killifish native to India and Sri Lanka. Its natural habitats are sheltered fresh and brackish water tanks, small streams and rivulets overgrown with vegetation. They are rarely use as an aquarium fish. It is often misidentified as Aplocheilus panchax or as Aplocheilus blockii.

References

parvus
Tropical fish
Freshwater fish of Sri Lanka
Fish described in 1916